"A Little Bit of Ecstasy" is a single by American recording artist Jocelyn Enriquez from her second album Jocelyn. Released in July 1997, it reached number 1 on the US Billboard Hot Dance Music/Maxi-Singles Sales, number 15 on the Billboard Hot Dance Music/Club Play chart, number 25 on the Rhythmic Top 40 and number 55 on the Hot 100.

Critical reception
Larry Flick from Billboard wrote that Enriquez "inches closer toward the pop stardom she deserves with this trippy dance ditty," and that she "strikes quite the seductive pose atop music that careens from rubbery disco to space-age freestyle." William Cooper of AllMusic highlighted "A Little Bit of Ecstasy" as the album's best track, writing "The sultry vocal, naughty lyrics, and unpredictable tempo changes make "A Little Bit of Ecstasy" a dancefloor classic along the lines of Donna Summer's "Love to Love You Baby".

Formats and track listings
CD single

12" maxi

CD maxi

CD maxi - Remixes

Charts

References

1997 songs
1997 singles
Jocelyn Enriquez songs
House music songs